Jaʿda bint al-Ashʿath (Full name: Jaʿda bint al-Ashʿath ibn Qays al-Kindī) was the wife of Hasan ibn Ali. 

Few details about her early life and biography are known. She was of Arab origin from the tribe of Kinda.

Shia view 
Shia Muslim historians wrote that Ja'da was promised gold and marriage to Yazid I. Seduced by the promise of wealth and power, she poisoned her husband, and then hastened to the court of Mu'awiya in Damascus to receive her reward. Mu'awiya reneged on his promise to marry her to his son and married her to another man. He said he could not marry her to his son for fear she would poison him too.

See also
 Husayn ibn Ali
 Hasan–Muawiya treaty

References

7th-century Yemeni people
7th-century Arabs
Yemeni women in politics
Kinda
People from Medina
Family of Muhammad
Wives of Shiite Imams